Anna of Serbia may refer to:

 Anna Diogenissa, Queen consort of Serbia; Uroš I r. 1112–1145
 Anna, Grand Princess of Serbia, Princess consort of Serbia; Stefan Nemanja r. 1166–1196
 Anna Dandolo (died 1264), Queen consort of Serbia; Stefan Nemanjić r. 1196–1228
 Anna Angelina Komnene Doukaina, Queen consort of Serbia; Stefan Radoslav r. 1228–1233
 Anna Terter of Bulgaria, Queen consort of Serbia; Stefan Uroš II Milutin r. 1228–1233
 Anna Neda of Serbia, Empress consort of Bulgaria; Michael Shishman r. 1323–1330
 Anna Basaraba, Empress consort of Serbia; Stefan Uroš V r. 1355–1371
 Anna Jakšić, Serbian Princess of the Jakšić noble family; Prince Vasili Lvovich Glinsky
 Anna Branković, Serbian Princess of the Branković dynasty; Fiodor Sanguszko of Volhynia

See also
 Helena of Serbia (disambiguation)
 Maria of Serbia (disambiguation)

Serbian royalty